Yarim is a town in the Ibb Governorate of Yemen.

Geography

Climate
Yarim has a cool semi-arid climate (Köppen climate classification: BSk)

History
In antiquity, the Yarim area was the core of the Himyarite Kingdom, which ruled over much of Southern Arabia from about 115 BC to about AD 575. The Himyarite capital of Zafar was located about 9 miles south of Yarim.

The Swedish explorer and naturalist Peter Forsskål (1732–1763) died in Yarim, where he went to collect botanical and zoological specimens.

Yarim was captured by the Houthis in October 2014 as part of the Houthi insurgency in Yemen. It was subsequently targeted by Operation Decisive Storm.

See also 
Al-Sahul

References

Populated places in Ibb Governorate